Universities Ireland is an organisation that promotes collaboration and co-operation between universities in both the Republic of Ireland and Northern Ireland. It was launched in July 2003 by the nine university presidents on the island of Ireland, with Professor Gerry McKenna, Vice Chancellor and President of the University of Ulster, as founding chair. It is funded by the member universities themselves; the Department of Education and Skills in the Republic of Ireland; the Department for Employment and Learning in Northern Ireland; and InterTradeIreland, an all-island body under the North/South Ministerial Council.

Members of Universities Ireland
Dublin City University
Maynooth University
Open University
Queen's University Belfast
Technological University Dublin
Ulster University
University College, Cork
University College, Dublin
University of Dublin
University of Limerick
University of Galway

See also
 Irish Universities Association
 Universities UK
 List of higher education institutions in the Republic of Ireland

References

External links
 Official website - Universities Ireland

Educational organisations based in Ireland